Richard Tsai (born 1957 or 1958) is a Taiwanese billionaire businessman. He and his brother Daniel Tsai run Fubon Financial Holding Co., founded by their father Tsai Wan-tsai. On the Forbes 2016 list of the world's billionaires, Richard Tsai was ranked #722 with a net worth of US$2.4 billion.

Tsai resides in Taipei, Taiwan. He is married and has two children.

References

Taiwanese billionaires
21st-century Taiwanese businesspeople
1950s births
Living people
Year of birth missing (living people)
Place of birth missing (living people)
Tsai family of Miaoli